Diary of A Housewife is a (2001) short film directed by Vinod Sukumaran. The screenplay is written by Mohan Raghavan. The cinematographer of the film is Santosh Thundiyil, who is one of India's top cinematographers today.  The film won the National Film Award for Best First Non-feature Film of a Director in 2002.

This film focuses on the concept of waiting and philosophical crisis of war. Through a young wife, it deals with philosophy of war, and the hopes and expectations related to it.

The film revolves around three female characters; a young lady, and old woman, and a girl.

Major film festival screenings
Inaugural Film of Indian Panorama at International Film Festival of India (IFFI 2002) held in New Delhi.
Asian Cinema Section of Commonwealth Film Festival, Manchester (CFF 2002)
River to River Florence-India Film Festival in Italy 2002
Competition Section of Mumbai International Film festival (MIFF 2002)
World Cinema Section of International Film Festival of Kerala (IFFK2002)
National Film Festival organized by Kerala State Chalachitra Academy (2003)

2001 documentary films
Documentary films about war
Indian documentary films
Documentary films about women
2001 films
Works about women in war